In Newton's theory of gravitation and in various relativistic classical theories of gravitation, such as general relativity, the tidal tensor represents 
tidal accelerations of a cloud of (electrically neutral, nonspinning) test particles,
tidal stresses in a small object immersed in an ambient gravitational field.

The tidal tensor represents the relative acceleration due to gravity of two test masses separated by an infinitesimal distance. The component  represents the relative acceleration in the  direction produced a displacement in the  direction.

Tidal tensor for a spherical body
The most common example of tides is the tidal force around a spherical body (e.g., a planet or a moon).
Here we compute the tidal tensor for the gravitational field outside an isolated spherically symmetric massive object.  According to Newton's gravitational law, the acceleration a at a distance r from a central mass m is 

(to simplify the math, in the following derivations we use the convention of setting the gravitational constant G to one. To calculate the differential accelerations, the results are to be multiplied by G.)

We will directly compute each component of the tidal tensor, expressed in this frame.
First, compare the gravitational forces on two nearby objects lying on the same radial line at distances from the central body differing by a distance h:

Because in discussing tensors we are dealing with multilinear algebra, we retain only first order terms, so .

Using some elementary trigonometry and the small angle approximation, we find that the force vectors differ by a vector tangent to the sphere which has magnitude

Again, since there is no acceleration in the radial direction due to displacements in either of the azimuthal directions, the other azimuthal terms are zero: .

Combining this information, we find that the tidal tensor is diagonal with frame components

This is the Coulomb form characteristic of spherically symmetric central force fields in Newtonian physics.

Hessian formulation
In the more general case where the mass is not a single spherically symmetric central object, the tidal tensor can be derived from the gravitational potential , which obeys the Poisson equation:

where  is the mass density of any matter present, and where  is the Laplace operator.  Note that this equation implies that in a vacuum solution, the potential is simply a harmonic function.

The tidal tensor is given by the traceless part 

of the Hessian

where we are using the standard Cartesian chart for E3, with the Euclidean metric tensor

Using standard results in vector calculus, this is readily converted to expressions valid in other coordinate charts, such as the polar spherical chart

Spherically symmetric field

As an example, we can calculate the tidal tensor for a spherical body using the Hessian.  Next, let us plug the gravitational potential  into the Hessian.  We can convert the expression above to one valid in polar spherical coordinates, or we can convert the potential to Cartesian coordinates before plugging in.  Adopting the second course, we have , which gives

After a rotation of our frame, which is adapted to the polar spherical coordinates, this expression agrees with our previous result.

In General Relativity

In general relativity, the tidal tensor is generalized by the Riemann curvature tensor. In the weak field limit, the tidal tensor is given by the components  of the curvature tensor.

See also
 Tidal force

References

External links
 
 
 

Tensor physical quantities
Gravity